Mark Howard may refer to:

 Mark Howard (footballer, born January 1986), English footballer
 Mark Howard (footballer, born September 1986), English football goalkeeper
 Mark Howard (broadcaster), Australian television broadcaster on 9am with David & Kim on Network Ten
 Mark Howard, musician and member of the Cluster Pluckers
 Mark Howard (producer) (born 1964), record producer
 Mark Howard (racing driver) (born 1965), British racing driver

See also
 Marc Howard (disambiguation)